Elizabeth Scarlett Jagger (born March 2, 1984) is a British-American activist, model and actress.

Personal life
Born in New York City to American model Jerry Hall and the Rolling Stones lead singer Mick Jagger, she has seven siblings. Among them are Georgia May Jagger, James Jagger, Gabriel Jagger, and paternal half-sister Jade Jagger. Elizabeth Jagger grew up in London, where she attended Ibstock Place School.

Jagger is an activist for the Equal Rights Amendment. Jagger successfully lobbied for the Equal Rights Amendment to pass in Illinois in 2018.

Career
Jagger's first appearance on the fashion runway was in 1998, when she modeled for Thierry Mugler alongside her mother. During the Rolling Stones' 1999 Bridges to Babylon tour, she and her sister Georgia May Jagger sang backup vocals. Jagger also modeled for Tommy Hilfiger in Spring/Summer 2016 campaign.

Jagger was signed as the face of Lancôme's LCM range of cosmetics in September 2002.

In 2005, she was chosen to represent the Spanish fashion chain Mango.

In January 2013, she became the face of New Skinny Lingerie Campaign.

In 2013, Jagger starred in a campaign for Wrangler Jeans.

In 2016, Jagger modeled for Redken.

In 2017, Jagger starred in a Gap campaign.

In 2018, Jagger walked for Sonia Rykiel.

Filmography

References

External links
 
 

1984 births
Living people
Female models from New York (state)
American film actresses
English female models
English people of Australian descent
English people of American descent
English people of Irish descent
English people of Dutch descent
American people of Australian descent
American people of English descent
American people of Irish descent
American people of Dutch descent
20th-century American women
21st-century American actresses
20th-century English women
21st-century English actresses